The Bad Companions is a 1932 British comedy film directed by J. O. C. Orton and starring Nor Kiddie, Renee Gadd and Wallace Lupino. The title is a reference to the 1929 novel The Good Companions by J. B. Priestley which was itself made into a film the following year.

It was made at Welwyn Studios as a second feature by British International Pictures.

Cast
 Nor Kiddie as Pip  
 Renee Gadd as Josie  
 Wallace Lupino as Blinks  
 Hal Gordon as Natkie  
 Lesley Wareing as Secretary

References

Bibliography
 Low, Rachael. Filmmaking in 1930s Britain. George Allen & Unwin, 1985.
 Wood, Linda. British Films, 1927-1939. British Film Institute, 1986.

External links

1932 films
British comedy films
1932 comedy films
1930s English-language films
Films shot at Welwyn Studios
Films directed by J. O. C. Orton
Quota quickies
British black-and-white films
1930s British films